The UCL Prize Lecture in Life and Medical Sciences (previously UCL Prize Lecture in Clinical Science) is a prize awarded annually by University College London since 1997. The prize lecture has become the pre-eminent series on contemporary science in Europe and the annual lecture provides an opportunity to debate and celebrate important scientific advancements.

Recipients
 1997 Klaus Rajewsky
 1998 Joseph L. Goldstein (Nobel Prize in Medicine 1985)
 1999 Stanley B. Prusiner (Nobel Prize in Medicine 1997)
 2000 James Watson (Nobel Prize in Medicine 1962)
 2001 Judah Folkman
 2002 J. Craig Venter
 2003 Sydney Brenner (Nobel Prize in Medicine 2002)
 2004 Robert Weinberg (Woolf Prize 2004)
 2005 Richard Axel (Nobel Prize in Medicine 2004)
 2006 Harold Varmus (Nobel Prize in Medicine 1989)
 2007 Tadataka Yamada
 2008 Susumu Tonegawa (Nobel Prize in Physiology or Medicine 1987) 
 2009 Martin Evans (Nobel Prize Physiology or Medicine 2007)
 2010 Barry Marshall (Nobel Prize in Medicine 2005)
 2011 Roger Tsien (Nobel Prize in Chemistry 2008)
 2012 Jeffrey Friedman (Albert Lasker Award 2010)
 2013 Gary Ruvkun (Louisa Gross Horwitz Prize 2009)
 2014 Anthony W. Segal
 2015 Sir John Gurdon (Nobel Prize in Physiology or Medicine 2012) 
 2016 Françoise Barré-Sinoussi (Nobel Prize in Physiology or Medicine 2008)
 2017 Patrick Vallance
 2018 James P. Allison (Nobel Prize in Physiology or Medicine 2018)
 2019 Jennifer Doudna (Nobel Prize in Chemistry 2020)
 2020 Ann Graybiel

See also

 List of medicine awards
 List of prizes named after people

References

Awards established in 1997
Biology education in the United Kingdom
British lecture series
British science and technology awards
Medicine awards
Medical lecture series
University College London